
Leninist historiography refers to the approach to studying history that was advocated by Vladimir Lenin, a Russian communist revolutionary and politician who was the first leader of the Soviet Union. Leninist historiography emerged in the early 20th century, and it was based on the idea that history should be used as a tool for achieving revolutionary goals.

According to Lenin, the study of history should not be focused on understanding the past for its own sake, but rather on using the lessons of history to further the cause of socialist revolution. He argued that history was shaped by the struggle between different classes, and that the role of the historian was to uncover the underlying class conflicts that shaped historical events.

Lenin believed that the study of history should be guided by a materialist perspective, which held that historical change was driven by economic forces rather than ideas or values. He argued that the bourgeoisie (the capitalist class) used their control of the means of production to exploit the working class, and that the ultimate goal of socialist revolution was to overthrow the bourgeoisie and establish a classless society.

Leninist historiography was influential in shaping the way history was studied and taught in the Soviet Union, and it had a significant impact on the development of Marxist historiography more broadly. However, it was also controversial, and it was criticized by some for its narrow focus on class struggle and its tendency to present a one-sided view of history. Despite these criticisms, Leninist historiography remains an important and influential approach to studying history.

References

Sources 
 "Marxism and the Interpretation of Culture," edited by Cary Nelson and Lawrence Grossberg
 "The Marxist Theory of the State," by Ralph Miliband
 "The Revolutions of 1989," by J. L. Black
 "The Soviet Union: A Very Short Introduction," by Stephen Lovell

Additional Sources in Russian 
 "Ленин и историография" by М. Бонч-Бруевич
 "Марксизм и история" by Л. Д. Бруни

Additional Sources in Hungarian 
 "A leninizmus történetírása" by György Bence
 "A marxizmus és a történelem" by László Péter

Historiography
Leninism
Social theories